Stade Mustapha Ben Jannet is a multi-use stadium in Monastir, Tunisia.  It is currently used by US Monastir, and was used for the 2004 African Cup of Nations.  The stadium holds 20,000 people and sometimes, it's used as a home for Tunisia national football team.

History
Inaugurated in 1958, this stadium with suspended tiers thanks to the technique of "cantilevered ball joint" used by the architect Olivier-Clément Cacoub initially offers a capacity of 3,000 places. Over time, several expansion works were carried out: its capacity was increased in the late 1990s to more than 10,000 places. On the occasion of the organization of the 2004 African Cup of Nations, new works allow to reach a capacity of 20,000 places.

Name
The stadium is named after Mustapha Ben Jannet, a nationalist militant executed by the French guards and having gathered the footballers of Monastir around a football team: US Monastir.

Equipment
The stadium is integrated into the sports complex of the city of Monastir, Tunisia, located a few hundred meters from the city center, which extends over 11 hectares and includes a sports hall, an indoor swimming pool, a tennis complex and various golf courses, training.

References

Monastir
US Monastir (football)